David Kelvin Bolstad (12 May 1969 – 19 November 2011) was a New Zealand representative woodchopper. He was Stihl Timbersports Series champion five times between 2001 and 2008. His father Sonny Bolstad was also a New Zealand representative axeman. David Bolstad died suddenly in 2011 after winning a competition in the town of Waiuku.

References

External links
David Bolstad remembered at stihltimbersports.us
David Kelvin Bolstad NZ Herald obituary
Hartevelt, A. "Axeman David Bolstad dies suddenly," Rotorua Daily Post 23 November 2011. Retrieved 13 October 2012.

1969 births
2011 deaths
New Zealand woodchoppers
People from Manawatū-Whanganui
20th-century New Zealand people
21st-century New Zealand people